Czesława Gospodarek (née Cieślak; 10 June 1938 – 5 December 2011), known by her stage name Violetta Villas, was a Polish and international cabaret star, singer, actress, composer and songwriter. Her voice was characterized as coloratura soprano, which spanned over four octaves. She could play the piano, violin, and trombone and had absolute pitch. Characterisations of her included "the voice of the atomic age", "the singing toast of the continent", "a voice like French champagne", and the "Polish Yma Sumac". Villas was the first star of the Casino de Paris at Dunes Hotel & Casino in Las Vegas (1966–1970).

Villas was known for her conspicuous wardrobe and number-one hits. During her show business career, Villas acted in six films, performed in numerous musical shows, and recorded almost three hundred songs in ten languages, including Polish, English, French, German, Italian, Latin, Neapolitan, Russian, Spanish and Portuguese. She was an animal rights activist.

In 2011, Villas received the Medal for Merit to Culture – Gloria Artis.

Biography

Early life
Villas was born in Heusy, Liège province, the third of four children. She spent her childhood in Belgium. Her father, Bolesław Cieślak (4 December 1907 – 9 May 1960), was a miner and bandmaster, and her mother, Jane (26 January 1914 – 17 February 1985), was a housewife. In 1948 she came with her parents to Poland and settled in Lewin Kłodzki, where she began studying music. She played the piano and violin in her youth.

In 1956 she began studying solo singing at the State Musical High School in Szczecin. She continued her artistic education in Wrocław with professor Gisela Posh. In 1959 she began classical vocal lessons with professor Eugenia Falkowska in Warsaw.

1960–1965: Early career
In 1960, Villas made her debut on Polskie Radio at the invitation of its director of music, Władysław Szpilman. Her first broadcast songs were "Gdy zakwitną czereśnie" and "Ja nie mogę tamtej drugiej znieść". She recorded her first album, Rendez-vous with Violetta Villas, in 1962. She received her first noteworthy prize at the Sopot Festival in 1961 and 1962. In 1964, 1965 and 1966 she performed at National Festival of Polish Song in Opole.

In the early 1960s, Villas toured many countries in Europe, including Germany, Belgium, Switzerland, Spain, Russia, Czechoslovakia, Bulgaria and Romania, as well as in the United States, Canada and Israel.

In 1964 at the National Festival of Polish Song in Opole, Bruno Coquatrix invited her to France. At the 3rd Festival International des Variétés et Music-Halls in Rennes, Villas received her Grand Prix International d'Interpretation (she sang including Ave Maria). In 1965, she performed at the Fontaine Theatre (show Roue de la Chance, director André Chanu). In 1966, at a personal request of Bruno Cocquatrix, Villas appeared in the Grand Music Hall de Varsovie, revue program at Olympia. The premiere was 26 July 1966. Villas sang including Ave Maria no Morro and Hiroshima Mon Amour. In Paris she was approached by Frederic Apcar, who invited her to Las Vegas.

1966–1970: Las Vegas and Casino de Paris
In December 1966 Villas performed at the Casino de Paris at Dunes Hotel & Casino. In her first program she sang including "Under Paris Skies", "Granada", "O Sole Mio", "Strangers in the Night" and "". Villas sang in duets with Frank Sinatra, Paul Anka, Barbra Streisand, Charles Aznavour, Sammy Davis, Jr., Eartha Kitt, and Dean Martin.

Her personal stylist was Patrick Valette, a Frenchman from fashion house Dior. She performed her show with a hundred-person French ballet. She lived in a villa with private swimming pool. In late '60s Villas recorded twenty songs for American television and Capitol Records. In March 1968 began a screen test for MGM film studio, where she was later signed to a movie contract.

1971–1987: Isolation and comeback
Villas was offered a lucrative eight-year contract with Paramount Pictures but turned it down because of her mother's illness, which saw her return to Poland. The Polish Communist authorities confiscated her passport, which confined her in Poland for over a decade. However, she was not completely banned from the media and was able to pursue her career locally. In 1985, she made a comeback, just a few years after martial law ended, in a series of sold-out performances. Authorities returned her passport, and she resumed her international career. She later toured the US and Australia.

In 1987 she went on the tour "Violetta" in the United States and Canada. The premiere was 14 September at Carnegie Hall, where she received a standing ovation. In New York her concert was sold out. Villas performed in Las Vegas, Denver, Miami, Texas, Montreal and Chicago.

Theatre
Before Villas started her theatre career in Poland, she performed in international revue shows in France and United States. In 1978 she played at the Grand Theatre in Łódź in the musical show Kochajmy się. In the 1970s/80s Villas was a star of the Siren Theatre in Warsaw. Villas played several roles in her theatre career, including Lygia in Trzeci program (The third programme, 1978) and the main role in the revue Violetta (1986–1988). In 1986 she returned to theatre, performing in Violetta with an orchestra and ballet.

In 1992, Villas played in the musical Hello, Dolly! at Cracow Operetta House. In the 1990s she performed at Warsaw Operetta House in her own programme, The Violetta Villas Show.

Personal life
In 1954, when she was 16, Villas married lieutenant Gospodarek but they divorced just two years later in September 1956. Her parents had pressured her into the marriage but she did not truly love him. She left her husband to study music in Szczecin. They had one child, Krzysztof Gospodarek. In 1967 she married Harry B. Malter, an American businessman and entrepreneur. They were divorced several years later.

In 1987 she met an American businessman and millionaire of Polish descent, Ted Kowalczyk, and married him on 6 January 1988 in Chicago. The wedding ceremony was held at a banquet room of the "Orbit" Restaurant, a fixture of Chicago's Polish Village. They divorced in December 1988. He gave many interviews in the media about their marriage, but she said on a TV show "I made an error, that I believed so fast."

Villas struggled with alcohol and morphine addiction, according to her estranged son. Apparently, according to a show on Polish national public television, Villas suffered from delusional disorder for years, which strained her relationship with family and friends.

From 1968 to 1973 she provided information about her show business colleagues to the Security Service of the Ministry of Internal Affairs informant under the code name Gabriella.

Villas died on 5 December 2011 in Lewin Kłodzki at the age of 73.

Discography

Studio albums
 1962 Rendez-vous with Violetta Villas
 1966 Violetta Villas
 1967 Violetta Villas (reissue)
 1968 For you my darling
 1968 About Love...
 1977 There is no love without jealousy
 1985 Las Vegas
 1986 Violetta Villas (reissue)
 1992 The most beautiful Christmas carols
 1996 Daddy 2 guest star
 1997 Christmas carols
 1997 Villas sings Christmas carols
 2001 When Jesus Christus was born...
 2001 Violetta Villas (reissue)
 2001 There is no love without jealousy (reissue)
 2001 For you my darling (reissue)
 2003 Valentine hits
 2004 Christmas carols from heart
 2008 To comfort the heart and warmth the soul
 2009 The most beautiful Christmas carols (reissue)

Live
 1994 Dolly
 1994 I am what I am (reissue)
 1998 Dolly (reissue)
 2006 I am what I am (reissue)

Singles
 1961 "I don't believe you"
 1961 "Such a frost"
 1961 "I don't make it"
 1961 "For you my darling"
 1961 "Red Marianna"
 1961 "Secret"
 1962 "Get married, Johny!"
 1962 "Cuckoo clock"
 1962 "It speak maracas"
 1962 "Look straight into my eyes"
 1962 "When Allah goes"
 1962 "Ali alo"
 1963 "Fan"
 1964 "To you, mother"
 1964 "Joseph"
 1964 "The love begins with a smile"
 1964 "There is a time for love"
 1964 "Is not"
 1966 "To you, mother"
 1978 "For mum"
 1986 "Mundial '86"
 1987 "The pine from my dream"
 1987 "Take me from Barcelona"
 1987 "Everywhere you go"
 1987 "The wild woman"

Flexi discs
 1962 Do you like to dance?
 1964 There is a time for love
 1964 Forty chesnut-trees
 1964 Recalling Masuria
 1965 Mamma
 1965 I will travel to you
 1965 To you, mother
 1968 It's raining in Zakopane
 1970 I returned to you
 1972 There is no love without jealousy
 1974 To you, mother

Compilation albums
 1980 Old hits
 1987 The greatest hits
 1992 For you my darling
 1992 The best of
 1995 Violetta Villas – gold hits
 1996 Gold hits
 1996 Only to you
 1997 I am what I am
 1998 Platinum collection
 2000 Gold hits
 2003 To you, mother
 2003 Magic memories
 2009 From the Polish Radio archive
 2010 40 Violetta Villas songs
 and 46 Various Artists-type compilations

Filmography 

Movie
 1969 How to commit marriage
 1969 Heaven with a gun
 1969 Paint your wagon
 1970 Dzięcioł (The Woodpecker)
 1983 Dream about Violetta
 1989 Violetta Villas

Television
 1963 Revue of the Polskie Nagrania
 1964 Dancing Joe
 1965 Roue de la chance
 1966 Professor Tutka's club
 1970 Violetta Villas sings
 1975 The wedding
 1977 Sentiments
 1978 Good evening, it's Łódź!
 1985 Summer Studio
 1985 Beautiful and excellent
 1988 Violetta
 1993 Violetta Villas show – live at Warsaw Operetta
 1995 Only to You
 1996 Concert on a barge
 1999 Violetta V. – live

Repertoire

1. Song festivals – Sopot, Opole, Knokke-Heist, Basel etc. (1961–1964)
 "Ave Maria no Morro"
 "For You My Darling"
 "Look Straight into My Eyes"
 "Si señor"
 "The Time Will Come"
 "To You, Mother"

2. "Roue de la chance", Theatre Fontaine in Paris (1965)
 "Ave Maria no Morro"
 "Look Straight into my Eyes"

3. "Grand music hall de Varsovie", Olympia in Paris (1966)
 "Ave Maria no Morro"
 "Hiroshima Mon Amour"
 "Look Straight into my Eyes"
 "Non C'est Rien"

4. "Casino de Paris", Dunes in Las Vegas (1967–1969)
 "Ave Maria no Morro"
 "C'est si bon"
 "Dark Eyes"
 "Et Maintenant"
 "Gounod's Ave Maria"
 "Free Again"
 "Granada"
 "Hello, Dolly!"
 "I Will Wait for You"
 "L'amour Est Un Oiseau Rebelle"
 "Libiamo ne' lieti calici"
 "My Heart Belongs to Daddy"
 "Ne me quitte pas"
 "O sole mio"
 "Somewhere My Love"
 "Strangers in the Night"
 "Un bel dì vedremo"
 "Under Paris Skies"
 "Under the Bridges of Paris"
 "This Is My Song"
 "Vissi d'arte"
 "What Now My Love"

5. "Villas Revue", Congress Hall in Warsaw (1968)
 "Dark Eyes"
 "Hello, Dolly!"
 "L'amour Est Un Oiseau Rebelle"
 "Libiamo ne' Lieti Calici"
 "My Heart Belongs to Daddy"
 "Strangers in the Night"
 "This Is My Song"

6. "Violetta", international concert tour started at Carnegie Hall in New York (1987–1988)
 Arias from "Carmen"
 "Dark Eyes"
 "Granada"
 "Happiness" (Polish – "Szczęście")
 "If You Go Away"
 "Kiss me hotly" (Polish – "Całuj gorąco")
 "Mechanical doll" (Polish – "Mechaniczna lalka")
 "Strangers in the Night"
 "Summertime"
 "Violetta"

References

External links

 Villas's biodata and filmography (in Polish)
 

1938 births
2011 deaths
20th-century Polish actresses
Ballad musicians
Capitol Records artists
Contraltos
German-language singers
Italian-language singers
Musicians from Las Vegas
Polish composers
Polish sopranos
Polish film actresses
Polish emigrants to the United States
Polish musical theatre actresses
Polish Roman Catholics
Polish television actresses
Polish songwriters
Polish pop singers
Portuguese-language singers
Russian-language singers
American sopranos
Spanish-language singers of the United States
Singers with a four-octave vocal range
Torch singers
Traditional pop music singers
Polish women composers
21st-century American women